Harald the Stalwart (Swedish: Harald Handfaste) is a 1946 Swedish historical adventure film directed by Hampe Faustman and starring George Fant, Georg Rydeberg and Elsie Albiin. It was shot at the Helsinki studios of Suomen Filmiteollisuus and on location on the island of Suomenlinna. The film's sets were designed by the art directors Bertil Duroj and Karl Fager.

Synopsis
In fifteenth century Sweden a local highwaymen leads the oppressed peasantry  against the tyrannical rule of a foreign bailiff. In order to seek revenge the bailiff plans to marry Karin, the rebel's beloved. When she refuses he decides instead to execute her.

Cast
 George Fant as 	Harald Didriksson a.k.a. Harald Handfaste
 Georg Rydeberg as 	Von Dotzen
 Elsie Albiin as Karin Eghilsdotter
 Tord Stål as 	Pater Laurentius
 Gösta Gustafson as Eghil Sjunnesson
 Gunnar Olsson as 	Bosse
 Thor Modéen as Björnram
 Ragnar Falck as 	Vesslan
 Nils Hallberg as Tjuvaskata, robber
 Olle Hilding as 	Harald's father
 Artur Rolén as 	Getaskalle, robber
 Hanny Schedin as 	Kersti, Karin's mother
 Vera Valdor as 	Von Dotzen's daughter
 Wiktor Andersson as 	Peasant
 Hampe Faustman as Peasant
 Erik Forslund as Poor farmer 
 Georg Skarstedt as 	Poor farmer 
 Ivar Wahlgren as 	Poor farmer 
 Gunn Wållgren as 	Peasant woman

References

Bibliography 
 Qvist, Per Olov & von Bagh, Peter. Guide to the Cinema of Sweden and Finland. Greenwood Publishing Group, 2000.

External links 
 

1946 films
1946 adventure films
1940s Swedish-language films
Films directed by Hampe Faustman
Swedish historical adventure films
1940s historical adventure films
Films set in the 15th century
Films shot in Helsinki
1940s Swedish films
Films based on Swedish comics
Live-action films based on comics